Nestor of Thessaloniki was a companion of St. Demetrius of Thessaloniki (October 26).  St. Nestor's feast day is celebrated on October 27. Thessaloniki is a city in Greece.

Having been moved to act against the mighty Lyeios (or Lyaeus), a most feared gladiator who mocked and tormented the Christians in the arena, Nestor went to see the imprisoned St. Demetrius and asked for his blessing to fight and defeat Lyeios.  With the blessing of the saint and faith in God, he entered the arena and mortally struck Lyeios.

Maximian, the emperor, was angered by this and ordered that Nestor be slain with his own sword.  The year of his death is reported variously as 290, 296, or 306 AD.

External links
 The Passion (BHL 2122) and Miracles (BHL 2123) of St. Demetrius by Anastasius the Librarian tr. by David Woods
Martyr Nestor of Thessalonica (OCA)
Nestor the Martyr of Thessaloniki (GOARCH)
Demetrios the Myrrhbearer & Great Martyr of Thessaloniki (GOARCH)

3rd-century deaths
Saints of Roman Thessalonica
3rd-century Christian martyrs
Year of birth unknown
Military saints